Bryan William Massey (born June 13, 1971) is an American actor. He is best known for his gravelly voice and sense of humor. He has appeared in numerous movies, TV shows, video games and cartoons. He is also the co-creator/co-owner of Galactic Bastards. He has provided hundreds of recognizable voices, including Ladd Russo from Baccano, Dick Gumshoe in Ace Attorney, Cocytus in Overlord, Oolong in the Funimation dub of the Dragon Ball series, and Wilheim in Borderlands: The Pre-Sequel.

Career 
Bryan Massey began his acting career at the age of 9 when he made the local paper by winning the 5th grade talent show lip-syncing to Steve Martin's "King Tut". In college, Bryan had lead roles in several musicals, participated in community theater, made several short movies with friends on campus, and was a nationally ranked member of the cheer-leading squad. After earning an associate degree in Radio/Television, Bryan decided to pursue his acting career and moved to Hollywood. He got his "Big Break" after being cast as violent psychopath Ladd Russo in the widely successful English dub of Baccano!, for which he won a "Dubby" Award in 2009. While he is mostly known for his voice work in animated mediums, he has also appeared in many Live-Action Movies and TV series, which began with a small role in the second season of Fox's Prison Break.

Personal life 
Bryan Massey was born in Pontiac, Michigan but moved to Dallas, Texas when he was just 7 years old. His first hobbies included filming videos, acting, and playing football, but he ended up quitting football in high school when it conflicted with his theatre schedule.  He became engaged to his wife, Page Burkhalter, on November 3, 2010. They have a daughter together named Burkley Massey.

Filmography

Anime

Anime Films

Film and television
 Boggy Creek – Troy Dupree
 Carried Away – Steve Franklin
 Chase – Hank Lacy
 Dallywood – Bryan
 Drive Angry
 Fangoria Blood Drive – The Driver
 Ghostbreakers – Mass Attack
 In the Land of Fireworks – Tyler
 Mad Money – Detective Brinkley
 Miami Magma – Police Chief Michaels
 Missionary Man – State Police Deputy
 Prison Break – Cop #2 (Season 2, Episode 3)
 Taking Tiger Mountain – Carl Sansom
 The Door – Bill Ryder
 The Familiar – Sam
 The X-Files – Nazi Soldier
 Universal Squadrons – Butcher
 W. – Skeeter
 Year one – New Guard
 Run Hide Fight - Gym Teacher

Video games
 Borderlands: The Pre-Sequel! – Wilhelm
 Dragon Ball Z: Ultimate Tenkaichi – Hero (Crazy)
 Dragon Ball Xenoverse - Time Patroller 
 Dragon Ball Xenoverse 2 - Time Patroller
 Dragon Ball Z: Kakarot - Oolong

Music
Bryan Massey was featured on the 'BLFC: A Musical Tail' album by Foxes And Peppers as a guest singer featured on the tracks 'Buy My Stuff', 'Draw Me In', and 'Hey Buddy'.

References

External links
 
 
 

1971 births
Living people
American male film actors
American male television actors
American male video game actors
American male voice actors